Chuck Rock is a 1991 slapstick side-scrolling platform video game developed and published by Core Design for the Atari ST and Amiga computers. A Commodore 64 port followed in 1992 and an Amiga CD32 version in 1994. The game was subsequently published by Krisalis Software for the Acorn Archimedes. Virgin Interactive published the game for the Sega Mega Drive/Genesis, Master System, and the Game Gear. Sony Imagesoft published the game for the Sega Mega-CD, Super NES, and Game Boy.

The character of Chuck Rock was an early mascot for Core Design before the introduction of Lara Croft in the 1996 game Tomb Raider, and the character of Chuck Rock himself and his family even featured in some UK comic books of the 1990s.

Chuck Rock spawned two video game sequels.

Plot
The setting of the game is a fictional prehistorical Stone Age-era world that is shared by both neanderthals, woolly mammoth, saber-tooth tigers, dinosaurs, and various assorted wild primeval monsters such as prehistoric mammals, giant insects, human-eating plants, and other exotica; thus, the setting is similar to that of films such as One Million Years B.C., or television shows such as The Flintstones or Dinosaurs.

The eponymous Chuck Rock is an overweight, square-jawed caveman characterized by loutish and lewd behaviour perhaps influenced by the lad culture of the 1990s. Chuck has a limited vocabulary (his favourite phrase being "Unga Bunga" and not much else), has a balding head cut into a punk-style mohawk, eats whole dinosaur-steaks raw in one bite, and has a penchant for picking up rocks and throwing them at things, hence his name. Chuck is a guitarist and singer (or shouter) in a rock band along with some other cavemen, his attractive wife Ophelia Rock, and a long-haired dinosaur bass player; and whilst on stage he wears a long wig to hide his balding head.

One day, Ophelia Rock is kidnapped by jealous local bully Garry Gritter (a pun on the name of contemporary pop star Gary Glitter) and carried off to Gritter's hang-out in the creepy dinosaur graveyard. Chuck must go to her rescue, searching for her in primeval jungles, swamps, lakes, an ice-capped mountain top, caves, and even the insides of a gigantic dinosaur.

Gameplay
Some dinosaurs will assist Chuck, such as the brontosaurus that helps Chuck across a swamp, although almost all dinosaurs encountered will attack Chuck. The game was notable for the major form of defense, which was to belly bounce with Chuck's beer belly, and for the catchphrase "unga bunga!" which was shouted by Chuck at the start of each level. Alternatively the character could pick up and "chuck" rocks at opponents. There is also a puzzle element to the game, as certain rocks are used to reach high areas. Health is indicated by the size of a heart icon. Health and score can be raised by finding dinosaur steaks and eating them. There is a boss at the end of each level.

Reception

Legacy
A direct sequel came in 1993 in the form of Chuck Rock II: Son of Chuck, which was also ported to several consoles like its predecessor. Chuck Rock II: Son of Chuck was more aimed at a younger audience than its predecessor, and the player character was not actually Chuck Rock himself but his infant son, Chuck Junior. It was not as well received by fans. Nonetheless around the time of the game's release, Core commissioned a comic strip in the long-running UK children's magazine LookIn, centering on the day-to-day lives of Chuck, Ophelia and Junior. As a meta-referential joke, Chuck Jr owned a 'SteggaDrive' console, as a reference to the Mega Drive name. A year later the magazine was closed (after almost 25 years), and the final strip saw Chuck being swept away from his boat, presumed dead but washing up on a tribal island and being revered as a God - as an inexplicable comic touch, mourners at his 'funeral' included then-Prime-Minister John Major.

A spin-off to Chuck Rock came in the game BC Racers, released later in the same year as Chuck Rock II: Son of Chuck. BC Racers was released on the Mega-CD, Sega 32X and 3DO, and the format was changed from that of a platformer to that of a racing game. The game was designed by Toby Gard, who later created Lara Croft. BC Racers retained the characters of Chuck Rock as well as his son Chuck Junior. Other prehistoric racers include Millstone Rockafella, Brick Jagger and Jimi Handtrix. The game was generally well received among the fans of the consoles in question, and BC Racers was named the Best Sega CD Driving/Racing Game of the Year in GameFan's 1994 "Megawards" (Vol 3, Iss. 1). BC Racers was released as freeware two years later for the PC.

Core promised an updated version of Chuck Rock for a next generation console, but it never materialized.

References

External links
Chuck Rock at MobyGames
Chuck Rock at GameFAQs
Chuck Rock at Hall of Light
Chuck Rock at Atari Mania

1991 video games
Acorn Archimedes games
Amiga games
Atari ST games
Amiga CD32 games
Commodore 64 games
Core Design games
Epic/Sony Records games
Game Boy games
Krisalis Software games
Master System games
Platform games
Prehistoric people in popular culture
Sega CD games
Game Gear games
Sega Genesis games
Square Enix franchises
Super Nintendo Entertainment System games
Video games scored by Matthew Simmonds
Video games set in prehistory
Virgin Interactive games
Video games developed in the United Kingdom